Fasciation (pronounced , from the Latin root meaning "band" or "stripe"), also known as cresting, is a relatively rare condition of abnormal growth in vascular plants in which the apical meristem (growing tip), which normally is concentrated around a single point and produces approximately cylindrical tissue, instead becomes elongated perpendicularly to the direction of growth, thus producing flattened, ribbon-like, crested (or "cristate"), or elaborately contorted tissue. Fasciation may also cause plant parts to increase in weight and volume in some instances. The phenomenon may occur in the stem, root, fruit, or flower head.

Some plants are grown and prized aesthetically for their development of fasciation.  Any occurrence of fasciation has several possible causes, including hormonal, genetic, bacterial, fungal, viral and environmental causes.

Cause
Fasciation can be caused by hormonal imbalances in the meristematic cells of plants, which are cells where growth can occur. Fasciation can also be caused by random genetic mutation. Bacterial and viral infections can also cause fasciation. The bacterial phytopathogen Rhodococcus fascians has been demonstrated as one cause of fasciation, such as in sweet pea (Lathyrus odoratus) plants, but many fasciated plants have tested negative for the bacteria in studies, hence bacterial infection is not an exclusive causation.

Additional environmental factors that can cause fasciation include fungi, mite or insect attack and exposure to chemicals. General damage to a plant's growing tip and exposure to cold and frost can also cause fasciation. Some plants, such as peas and cockscomb Celosia, may inherit the trait.

Genetic fasciation is not contagious, but infectious fasciation can be spread from infected plants to others from contact with wounds on infected plants, and from water that carries the bacteria to other plants.

Occurrence
Although fasciation is rare overall, it has been observed in over 100 vascular plant families, including members of the genera Acer, Aloe, Acanthosicyos, Cannabis, Celosia, Cycas, Delphinium, Digitalis, Echinacea, Euphorbia, Forsythia, Glycine max (specifically, soybean plants), Primula, Iochroma, Prunus, Salix, and many genera of the cactus family, Cactaceae. Cresting results in undulating folds instead of the typical "arms" found on mature saguaro cactus.

Some varieties of Celosia are raised especially for their dependably fasciated flower heads, for which they are called "cockscomb". The Japanese fantail willow (Salix sachalinensis 'Sekka') is another plant that is valued for its fasciations.

Prevention
Fasciation that is caused by bacteria can be controlled by not using fasciated plants and disposing of fasciated material. Avoiding injury to plant bases and keeping them dry can reduce the spread of bacteria. Avoidance of grafting fasciated plants and the pruning of fasciated matter can also reduce the spread of bacteria.

Examples

See also
 Adventitiousness
 Phyllody
 Witch's broom

References

Further reading

External links

 

Botany
Plant morphology